Maria Lucrécia Jardim (born 28 January 1971 in Caconga, Portuguese Angola) is a retired Portuguese sprinter who specialized in the 100 and 200 metres.

Achievements

External links
 
 
 
 

1971 births
Living people
Portuguese female sprinters
Athletes (track and field) at the 1992 Summer Olympics
Athletes (track and field) at the 1996 Summer Olympics
Olympic athletes of Portugal
Angolan emigrants to Portugal
Black Portuguese sportspeople
Olympic female sprinters